Adolfsson is a surname or an Icelandic patronymic. Notable people with the surname include:

Håkan Adolfsson (born 1971), Swedish bandy player
Steinar Dagur Adolfsson (born 1970), Icelandic footballer
Sune Adolfsson (born 1950), Swedish biathlete

Icelandic-language surnames